Demond Greene (born 15 June 1979) is a German–American professional basketball coach and former player. He played professionally for several seasons in, amongst others, the EuroLeague, the Greek Basket League and the German Basketball Bundesliga. Greene was a member of the Germany national team for several years and appeared with the team on both the FIBA World Championship and the Olympics.

Early life
Greene was born in Fort Hood, Texas, to an American father and German mother. The family later moved to Aschaffenburg in Germany where he grew up.

Professional career
Greene played with the number 24 for Bayern Munich from 2010 to 2014. Before transferring to Munich he played one season for the Greek club GS Olympia Larissa of the Greek Basket League. Before that he played two years for Brose Baskets from Bamberg and one year for Alba Berlin. During his time at Bayer Giants Leverkusen (2002–2005), he became one of the best German shooters. From 1997 to 2002 Greene played with DJK Würzburg, where he was a teammate of 13-time NBA All-Star Dirk Nowitzki.

International career
Greene was a member of the senior German national basketball team. He played at the EuroBaskets of 2005, 2007, and 2009; and also at the FIBA World Cups of 2006 and 2010. He also played at the Summer Olympic Games in 2008.

In all competitions, he averaged 7.3 points, 1.8 rebounds, and 0.7 assists per game.

Career statistics

EuroLeague

|-
| style="text-align:left;"| 2007–08
| style="text-align:left;" rowspan=1| Bamberg
| 11 || 11 || 27.0 || .476 || .393 || 1.000 || 1.5 || 1.4 || 1.2 || .0 || 9.2 || 6.1
|- class="sortbottom"
| style="text-align:left;"| Career
| style="text-align:left;"|
| 11 || 11 || 27.0 || .476 || .393 || 1.000 || 1.5 || 1.4 || 1.2 || .0 || 9.2 || 6.1

Coaching career 
Until 2018, he served as coach in the Bayern Munich youth set-up, from 2018 to 2020 he was the head coach of Bayern's reserve team and was named an assistant coach of the Bayern Bundesliga squad in 2020.

Personal
Greene's father is African American, and his mother is German.

References

External links
 Demond Greene  at beko-bbl.de 
 Demond Greene at draftexpress.com
 Demond Greene at eurobasket.com
 Demond Greene at euroleague.net
 Demond Greene at fiba.com

1979 births
Living people
Alba Berlin players
Basketball players at the 2008 Summer Olympics
Basketball players from Texas
Brose Bamberg players
FC Bayern Munich basketball players
German basketball coaches
German men's basketball players
German people of American descent
German people of African-American descent
Greek Basket League players
Olympia Larissa B.C. players
Olympic basketball players of Germany
People from Fort Hood, Texas
Point guards
Shooting guards
2010 FIBA World Championship players
2006 FIBA World Championship players
American men's basketball players